The 2018–19 season was Associazione Sportiva Roma's 91st in existence and 90th season in the top flight of Italian football. Having finished third the previous season, the club competed in Serie A, the Coppa Italia, and the UEFA Champions League.

The season was coach Eusebio Di Francesco's second in charge of the club. On 18 June 2018, Di Francesco extended his contract to remain as manager until 2020. However, after a poor string of results and elimination from the Champions League, Di Francesco was sacked on 7 March 2019 and replaced with former manager Claudio Ranieri.

Players

Squad information
Last updated on 26 May 2019
Appearances and goals include all competitions

Transfers

In

Loans in

Out

Loans out

Pre-season and friendlies

Competitions

Serie A

League table

Results summary

Results by round

Matches

Coppa Italia

UEFA Champions League

Group stage

Knockout phase

Round of 16

Statistics

Appearances and goals

|-
! colspan=14 style="background:#B21B1C; color:#FFD700; text-align:center"| Goalkeepers

|-
! colspan=14 style="background:#B21B1C; color:#FFD700; text-align:center"| Defenders

|-
! colspan=14 style="background:#B21B1C; color:#FFD700; text-align:center"| Midfielders

|-
! colspan=14 style="background:#B21B1C; color:#FFD700; text-align:center"| Forwards

|-
! colspan=14 style="background:#B21B1C; color:#FFD700; text-align:center"| Players transferred out during the season

Goalscorers

Last updated: 26 May 2019

Clean sheets

Last updated: 26 May 2019

Disciplinary record

Last updated: 26 May 2019

References

A.S. Roma seasons
Roma
Roma